Adderbury Lakes is a   Local Nature Reserve in Adderbury in Oxfordshire. It is owned and managed by  Adderbury Parish Council.

The lakes were created by Capability Brown in about 1768 as part of the landscaping of the grounds of Adderbury House. The reserve also includes woodland around the lakes and there is diverse wildlife.

There is access from Lake Walk.

References

Local nature reserves in Oxfordshire